Donna Jane Hope (Bauer), born 4 October 1970, is an Australian politician who represented the Liberal Party as the member for Carrum in the Victorian Legislative Assembly from 2010 to 2014, having previously served as the Deputy Mayor of the City of Kingston.

Hope obtained a Bachelor of Arts in Public Relations from RMIT and was previously employed as a Corporate Communications Consultant at the City of Greater Dandenong. She is a bowel cancer survivor and current ambassador for Bowel Cancer Australia, former ambassador for Bully Zero Australia Foundation, and  former board member of Frankston Business Network.

Hope entered Parliament after defeating Jenny Lindell in the 2010 state election.

While in Parliament, Hope embarked on the Kokoda trail in July 2013, initiating the ‘Bauer Kokoda Charity Challenge' and raised money for charities, Matt's Place and Pantry 5000.

Hope narrowly lost the electorate of Carrum in the 2014 Victorian state election to Labor's Sonya Kilkenny and unsuccessfully contested the same division in the 2018 Victorian state election.

References

1970 births
Living people
Members of the Victorian Legislative Assembly
Politicians from Melbourne
RMIT University alumni
Liberal Party of Australia members of the Parliament of Victoria
21st-century Australian politicians
21st-century Australian women politicians
Women members of the Victorian Legislative Assembly